The Dapto Canaries are an Australian rugby league football team based in the Wollongong suburb of Dapto. The club are a part of Country Rugby League and have competed in the Illawarra Rugby League premiership since its inception in 1911.

History, colours and emblem
The Dapto Canaries were established in 1911 and are one of five founding clubs of the Illawarra Rugby League. However, it took the Canaries many decades to win their first title in 1966, and they have been strong competitors ever since. The Canaries won four premierships in five years during the 1970s, and a further three in each of the 80s and 90s. They won another three consecutive premierships between 2000 and 2002, again in 2006, with their final premiership coming in 2016. The Dapto team is represented by a yellow canary on their emblem, displayed in front of a blue background. The inscription "Dapto R.L.F.C." is displayed underneath. Their jerseys reflect this emblem with the use of gold on blue. The Canaries play at Groundz Precinct, Dapto.

Players

Notable players
Players that have played or gone on to play in the Sydney Premiership, or selected for Country, New South Wales or Australia:
 Ronn Mann - Country (1948), NSW (1948)
 Bobby Dimond - Western Suburbs Magpies, Country (1948–49), NSW (1948–49), and Australian representative
 Peter Dimond - Western Suburbs Magpies (1958–67), Country (1957–69), NSW (1958–63), and Australia (1958–66)
 Lionel Simmonds - Country (1965–68)
 Noel Morris - Country (1969)
 Warwick Shirlaw (1971)
 Allan Fitzgibbon - Balmain Tigers (1968–70), Country (1971), NSW (1968),  ~~Dapto captain/coach (1971–81), Illawarra Steelers coach (1982–84)
 Ted Goodwin - St. George Dragons (1972–78), Newtown Jets (1979), Western Suburbs Magpies (1980–82), Country (1971)
 Eric White - Country (1975)
 Brian Hetherington - Newtown Jets (1978–81), Illawarra Steelers (1982–88), Country (1975–84), NSW (1984–86) 
 Ron Pilon - Country (1976), Newtown Jets (1977–78), Balmain Tigers (1980–81) 
 Steve Morris - St. George Dragons (1979–86), Easts (1987–90), Country (1978–81), NSW (1978–86), Australia (1978)
 Brian Johnson - Country (1978), St. George Dragons (1979–85), Warrington Wolves (1985–88), Easts (1986),
 Michael Priest - Country (1979)
 David Walsh (1990-98 Illawarra Steelers)
 John Simon - Illawarra Steelers (1990–95), Sydney City Roosters (1996), Parramatta Eels (1997–99), Auckland Warriors (2000), Wests Tigers (2001), NSW (1992–97), Australia (1997)
 Dean Callaway (1991-00 Illawarra Steelers, London Broncos)
 Paul McGregor - Illawarra Steelers (1991–98), St. George Illawarra Dragons (1999–2001), NSW (1992–1998), Australia (1994–97)
 Terry Lamey (1997–02 Illawarra Steelers, St George Illawarra Dragons, South Sydney Rabbitohs)
 Chris Leikvoll (1997-07 Illawarra Steelers, St George Illawarra Dragons)
 Craig Fitzgibbon (1998-09 Illawarra Steelers, St. George Illawarra Dragons, Sydney Roosters) 
 Daniel Mathews - Country (2000)
 Adam Blake - Country (2001–03)
 Mathew Head (2003–09 St George Illawarra Dragons, West Tigers, Hull F.C.)
 Shaun Wessell (2003 Cronulla Sharks)
 Dean Young (2003–13 St George Illawarra Dragons)
 Steve Southern (2004–11 North Queensland Cowboys, Newcastle Knights)
 Dan Hunt (2007–14 St George Illawarra Dragons)
 Michael Malone [Moorebank Rams, Milperra Colts, Menai Aquinas, Moorebank schoolboys]
 Blake Wallace (2017– Toronto Wolfpack)
 Shannon Wakeman (2017– Huddersfield Giants)
 Blake Lawrie (2017– St George Illawarra Dragons)
 Paul Rose English former professional rugby league footballer who played in the 1960s, 1970s and 1980s. He played at representative level for Great Britain, England and Yorkshire, and at club level for the Hull Kingston Rovers  and Hull F.C.

Honours

Team
 Illawarra Rugby League First Grade Premierships: 17
1966, 1968, 1975, 1976, 1977, 1979, 1982, 1983, 1985, 1990, 1992, 1994, 2000, 2001, 2002, 2006, 2016
 Illawarra Rugby League Club Championships: 9
1976, 1985, 1990, 1992, 1997, 2000, 2006, 2007, 2016

References

External links
 Dapto Canaries Homepage
 Country Rugby League Homepage
 Illawarra Rugby League Homepage

1911 establishments in Australia
Rugby league teams in New South Wales
Rugby league teams in Wollongong
Rugby clubs established in 1911